Bistra is a commune located in Alba County, Transylvania, Romania. It has a population of 5,066. It is composed of 35 villages: Aronești, Bălești, Bălești-Cătun, Bârlești, Bistra, Cheleteni, Ciuldești, Crețești, Dâmbureni, Dealu Muntelui, Durăști, Gănești, Gârde, Hodișești, Hudricești, Lipaia, Lunca Largă, Lunca Merilor, Mihăiești, Nămaș, Novăcești, Perjești, Poiana, Poiu, Rătitiș, Runcuri, Sălăgești, Ștefanca, Țărănești, Tolăcești, Tomnatec, Trișorești, Vârși-Rontu, Vârșii Mari and Vârșii Mici.

The commune is situated in the northwest corner of Alba County. It covers a surface of 138 km2 (about 1.8% of the total area of the county), making it the largest commune in Romania by surface area. Bistra is crossed from West to East for a length of 7 km by the Arieș river.  It is surrounded to the SE by the Trascău Mountains, the SW by the  Metaliferi Mountains and to the NE by the Gilău Mountains, with Muntele Mare as the highest peak (1,826 m).

Natives
Petru Pavel Aron

References

Communes in Alba County
Localities in Transylvania